After both finals have been played, both winners qualify to the Copa Libertadores. Of the two winners, the team with the highest points during the group stages will be dubbed "Mexico 2"

Finals
All times EST

2009 Final